Gato Negro (Spanish for "black cat") is 7 Year Bitch's final album and their only full-length to appear on a major label (Atlantic Records).

The record spawned three singles: "The History of My Future", "24,900 Miles Per Hour" and "Miss Understood" as well as a video for "24,900 Miles Per Hour".

Although the band had a bigger fan base than ever, Gato Negro failed to generate the sales Atlantic Records had hoped, eventually leading to their dismissal from the label.

Track listing 
All songs written by Vigil/Davis
"The History of My Future" 2:14
"Crying Shame" 4:09
"Disillusion" 3:05
"Deep in the Heart" 3:02
"The Midst" 3:29
"24,900 Miles Per Hour" 3:27
"Whoopie Cat" 3:02
"Miss Understood" 3:07
"Sore Subject" 2:06
"Rest My Head" 2:57
"2nd Hand" 1:44
"Jack" 2:36

Personnel 
 Selene Vigil — vocals
 Roisin Dunne — guitar
 Elizabeth Davis — bass
 Valerie Agnew — drums

References 

1996 albums
Atlantic Records albums
7 Year Bitch albums